Dietrich Siegl (born 18 March 1954) is an Austrian actor. He has appeared in more than sixty films since 1981. His parents, Ingrid Burkhard and Hannes Siegl, were both actors.

Selected filmography

References

External links 
 (archived)

1954 births
Living people
Austrian male film actors